Bagel Bites are a brand of frozen pizza bagel snacks produced by Kraft Heinz.

History
Bagel Bites were invented by Bob Mosher and Stanley Garkzynski, both of Fort Myers, Florida, who then sold the company to major food producer John Labatt Co. Later a large portion of Labatt Co. was purchased by Heinz in 1991 in a $500 million deal.  Bagel Bites is currently still owned by Heinz via the Ore-Ida brand. In 2022 the company pulled the product from Canadian shelves. No reason was given.

Varieties
The mini-bagels are topped with cheese and other pizza toppings. Bagel Bites are available in six flavors: Cheese & Pepperoni; Three Cheese; Cheese, Sausage & Pepperoni; Mozzarella Cheese; Supreme; Cheesy Garlic Bread; and Extreme Nacho. Bagel Bites come in 9, 18, 24, 40, and 72 count varieties. Bagel Bites are manufactured in Southwest Florida.

Bagel Bites also makes Breakfast Bagel Bites, which consists of breakfast toppings on the mini-bagel. These are available in Bacon & Cheese, Bacon Egg & Cheese, Bacon Sausage & Cheese and Sausage Egg & Cheese. Preparation of Bagel Bites involves either a microwave or an oven.

Popular culture

In the 1990s, Bagel Bites ran a television commercial, most popular during children's programming, featuring the jingle:

The lyrics were altered from The McGuire Sisters' 1957 single "Sugartime", written by Charlie "Sugartime" Phillips.

In 2002, an ad was aired featuring pro skateboarder Tony Hawk.

The jingle was performed on a web exclusive video for Late Night With Jimmy Fallon, in which he and Meat Loaf do a rock operatic style extended remake of the jingle (with additional lyrics), titled "Ode to Bagel Bites".

See also
 List of frozen food brands

References

External links 
 Bagel Bites

Bagel companies
Heinz brands
Jewish American cuisine
Frozen food brands